Bembras is a genus of marine ray-finned fish belonging to the family Bembridae, the deepwater flatheads. These fishes are found in the Indian Ocean and the western Pacific Ocean.

Taxonomy
Bembras was first proposed as a monotypic genus in 1829 by the French zoologist George Cuvier when he described Bembras japonica from Japan.  Cuvier did not explain the etymology of Bembras, however, it is thought that it may come from an ancient Greek word for some sort of small fish, such as anchovy, sprat or smelt. which at least dates as far back as Aristotle. Cuvier applied this type of name to other genera he put forward, such as Synodontis, Salanx or Premnas.

Species
There are currently seven recognized species in this genus:
 Bembras adenensis Imamura & L. W. Knapp, 1997
 Bembras andamanensis Imamura, Psomadakis & Thein, 2018
 Bembras japonica G. Cuvier, 1829
 Bembras leslieknappi Imamura, Psomadakis & Thein, 2018
 Bembras longipinnis Imamura & L. W. Knapp, 1998 (Longfin flathead)
 Bembras macrolepis  Imamura, 1998 (Bigscale flathead)
 Bembras megacephala  Imamura & L. W. Knapp, 1998 (Greenspotted flathead)

Characteristics
Bembras deepwater flatheads are differentiated from other Bembrid genera by having a lack of spines in the anal fin, a terminal lower jaw which does not protrude beyond the upper jaw and having the maxillae being relatively wide to its rear. They have between 28 and 32 scales in the lateral line and between 21 and 30 fin rays in each of the pectoral fins. The head is large at around 40% of the standard length.

Distribution and habitat

References

Bembridae
Taxa named by Georges Cuvier